Minerita is a 2013 Spanish short-documentary film about three women working the Potosi mines in Bolivia. The documentary was well received by critics and earned widespread critical acclaim. Minerita was shortlisted with nine other documentaries from 74 entries submitted to the 88th Academy Awards in the Documentary Short Subject category, but was not nominated as a finalist.

Synopsis
Minerita is the story of three women—Lucía (40), Ivone (16) and Abigail (17), who work as night watch women in the Cerro Rico mining district in Potosi, Bolivia.

Awards
 Social Impact Media Awards - Best Short Documentary Director.
 28th Goya Awards - Best Documentary Short Film.

See also
The Devil's Miner, a documentary film about child miners of the Cerro Rico.

References

External links
 Distributor site – Minerita
 Basque short films – Minerita
 

2013 films
2013 short documentary films
Spanish short documentary films
Documentary films about women
Documentary films about mining
Documentary films about Latin America
Films shot in Bolivia
Mining in Bolivia
Women in mining